The University of Northern Colorado (UNC) is a public university in Greeley, Colorado. The university was founded in 1889 as the State Normal School of Colorado and has a long history in teacher education. The institution has officially changed its name three times, first to Colorado State College of Education, at Greeley on February 16, 1935, Colorado State College on February 11, 1957, and its current form since May 1, 1970. Approximately 10,000 students are enrolled in six colleges. Extended campus locations are in Loveland, Denver/Aurora, and Colorado Springs. UNC's 19 athletic teams compete in NCAA Division I as members of the Big Sky Conference.

Campus

The campus is divided into two main areas: central and west. UNC's Central Campus includes the areas north of 20th Street and west of 8th Avenue in Greeley, Colorado. The residence halls on Central Campus have been designated a state historic district.

Organization
The board of trustees for the university oversees the administration and approves the university annual budget. Several members of the university's administrative team are ex officio members of the Board.

Presidents
The university has had 13 presidents since its establishment:
 Thomas J. Gray — 1890–1891
 James H. Hayes — (interim) 1891, November 11, 1915 – 1916
 Zachariah Xenophon Snyder — 1891–1915
 John Grant Crabbe — Late summer 1916–1924
 George Willard Frasier — 1924–1947
 William Robert Ross — 1947–1964 (assumed office December 20, 1947)
 Darrell Holmes — 1964–1971
 Frank P. Lakin — 1969, 1971 (interim)
 Richard R. Bond — 1971–1981
 Charles Manning (acting) — 1981
 Robert C. Dickeson — 1981–1991
 Richard Davies (acting) — January 1 – August 29, 1987
 Stephen T. Hulbert (interim) — July 1 – September 30, 1991
 Herman Lujan — 1991–1996
 Howard Skinner (interim) — June 1996 – June 1998
 Hank Brown — July 1998 – June 2002
 Kay Norton — July 2002 – July 2018
 Andy Feinstein - July 2018 – present

College of Performing and Visual Arts
The College of Performing and Visual Arts (PVA) is an arts community of practitioners, scholars, and learners representing a range of arts traditions and disciplines. 

UNC has a tradition as an arts institution and its main college offices, located in Guggenheim Hall, are one of the oldest buildings on campus.

Student life

Greek life

Traditional sororities
 Alpha Omicron Pi
 Alpha Sigma Alpha
 Alpha Phi
 Delta Zeta
 Sigma Kappa

Traditional fraternities
 Delta Sigma Phi
 Lambda Chi Alpha
 Pi Kappa Phi
 Pi Kappa Alpha

Multicultural sororities
 Lambda Theta Nu
 Pi Lambda Chi
 Sigma Lambda Gamma
 Lambda Theta Alpha
 Kappa Delta Chi

Multicultural fraternities
 Sigma Lambda Beta
 Nu Alpha Kappa
 Lambda Sigma Upsilon

Athletics

Sports teams at the school are called Bears. Northern Colorado joined the Big Sky Conference on July 1, 2006. The school mascot is Klawz the Bear and the school colors are navy blue and gold. The Fight Song is the "UNC Fight Song". Northern Colorado's Athletic Director is Darren Dunn.

The Bears play their football games at Nottingham Field, while the men's and women's basketball teams and women's volleyball team play at the Bank of Colorado Arena at Butler-Hancock Athletic Center. "Fear The Claw" is the student section slogan. Northern Colorado won its first Big Sky Championship in 2009 when the women's volleyball team beat Portland State to capture the Big Sky Volleyball Championship.

A number of the university's alumni have gone on to have professional sports careers. Vincent Jackson attended and played football at Northern Colorado from 2001 to 2004 before being drafted by the San Diego Chargers in the 2005 NFL Draft. Other football alumni for the school include punter Dirk Johnson, quarterback Kyle Sloter, safety Reed Doughty, and defensive lineman Aaron Smith.

Before upgrading to NCAA Division I in 2006, UNC was a member of the Rocky Mountain Athletic Conference from 1923 to 1972 and the Great Plains Athletic Conference (1972–76). Following several years of being conference independent, the university joined the North Central Conference. The Bears have won two Division II Football National Championships in 1996 and 1997. On March 9, 2011, the Bears won the Big Sky Conference tournament championship in men's basketball, clinching a trip to the 2011 NCAA Men's Division I Basketball Tournament, the first in the school's history. The Northern Colorado men's baseball program also ranks among the top 15 schools for most all-time NCAA College World Series appearances, tied with the University of Oklahoma at ten appearances apiece. The Northern Colorado women's softball team appeared in the first eleven Women's College World Series ever held in 1969–1979, advancing to but losing the title game in 1974.

Mascots

The bear became UNC's mascot in 1923. Before the school adopted the bear, athletes used the nickname "the Teachers." The bear was said to be inspired by a bear on top of an Alaskan totem pole donated by an 1897 alumnus in 1914. The totem pole was kept in the University Center, but under the federal Native American Graves Protection and Repatriation Act of 1990, the pole was reclaimed by the Tlingit in 2003.

Klawz is the mascot that attends all university sporting events. Klawz is the newest addition to the long line of Bears' mascots over the years at the university. Klawz made his first appearance in Nottingham Field on August 30, 2003, before the UNC football team opened their season against New Mexico Highlands.

Notable alumni
 William D. Alexander, filmmaker, winner of 1964 Cannes short film Palme d'Or for "The Village of Hope"
 Glen Alps, printmaker, coiner of term collagraph
 Bob Bacon, former Colorado State Senator
 Gregg Brandon, college football coach of Colorado School of Mines
 Dominic Breazeale, boxer
 Pat Burris, two-time Olympian judoka, Pan American Games bronze medalist 
 Jack Cassinetto, plein air painter
 Sa'ra Charismata, singer/songwriter (real name is Sara Haile)
 Earnest Collins Jr., football player and head coach for UNC
 Walt Conley, folk singer, musician and actor,
 Kimberly Corban, victims' rights advocate 
 Margaret L. Curry, state parole officer
 Steven Dietz, playwright
 Reed Doughty, football safety for Washington Redskins
 Ben Dreith, AFL and NFL referee
 Rick Edgeman, Professor of Sustainability & Enterprises Performance, Aarhus University (Denmark). Professor & Chair of Management and Center for Entrepreneurship Director, Fort Hays State university. Academician of the International Academy of Quality.
 Rhonda Fields, member of Colorado State House of Representatives
 Bill Frisell, jazz guitarist
 Justin Gaethje, professional mixed martial arts, currently competing in the UFC
 Greg Germann, actor from Ally McBeal and Dr. Tom Koracick on Grey's Anatomy
 Margaret Hayes Grazier, librarian, educator, and author
 Pat Haggerty, NFL referee
 Vincent Jackson, football player for Tampa Bay Buccaneers
 Virgil Jester, baseball pitcher for Milwaukee Braves
 Dirk Johnson, NFL punter
 Dave Keller, baseball minor league player and coach
 Bill Kenney, quarterback for Kansas City Chiefs and politician
 Maryanne Kusaka, politician
 Carlotta Walls LaNier, member of Little Rock Nine
Dr. Lynn Lashbrook, President and Founder of SMWW
 Mike Madden, former baseball pitcher for Houston Astros
 Beth Malone, Tony Award-nominated actress
Karyl McBride, psychotherapist and author
 James A. Michener, author
 Steven Moore, literary critic and Washington Post book reviewer
 Carol Mutter, Marine Corps Lieutenant General
 Rory Ogle, member of the New Mexico House of Representatives
 Andrew Perchlik, member of the Vermont Senate
 Amanda Peterson, famous actress, appeared in Can’t Buy Me Love.
 Mary Peltola, member of the United States House of Representatives from Alaska
 Lisa Poppaw, former Fort Collins city council member
 Sayyid Qutb, author and leading Islamist of 20th Century
 Jeannie Ritter, former First Lady of Colorado
 Jed Roberts, former CFL linebacker, defensive lineman, Edmonton Eskimos 
 Mary G. Ross, first Native American female engineer
 Neal Rubin, The Detroit News columnist and author of comic strip Gil Thorp
 Frankie Saenz, (attended) wrestler; professional Mixed Martial Artist, UFC Bantamweight
 David N. Senty, Air Force Major General
 Kyle Sloter, NFL quarterback
 Chesley B. "Sully" Sullenberger, Captain of U.S. Airways Flight 1549 that successfully landed in Hudson River in 2009; has a master in Public Administration from UNC
 Aaron Smith, football defensive end for Pittsburgh Steelers
 Loren Snyder, football quarterback for Dallas Cowboys
 Dave Stalls, football defensive end for Dallas Cowboys, Tampa Bay Buccaneers, Los Angeles Raiders and Denver Gold
 Tom Tancredo, R-CO, member of United States House of Representatives, presidential candidate
 Herve Tonye-Tonye, Canadian Football League linebacker, Toronto Argonauts
 Frank Wainright, former football tight end for New Orleans Saints, Philadelphia Eagles, Miami Dolphins and Baltimore Ravens
 Tyler Ward, musician and producer
 Wellington Webb, former Mayor of Denver
 Bill Welsh, radio and television announcer
 Ed Werder, reporter for ESPN
 Connie Willis, science-fiction author
 Claire Wilson, member of Washington State Senate
 Kenneth W. Winters, member of Kentucky State Senate
 Neyla Pekarek, vocalist and instrumentalist for the band The Lumineers

Notes

References

Further reading
 Albert Frank Carter – "Forty years of Colorado State Teachers College, formerly the State Normal School of Colorado, 1890–1930"
 Larson, Robert W; Boulder: Colorado Associated University Press, (1989). Shaping educational change: the first century of the University of Northern Colorado at Greeley. .
 Kurt Hinkle – "Northern Light: The Complete History of the University of Northern Colorado Football Program." (1998).

External links

 
 Northern Colorado athletics website
University of Northern Colorado rugby football club

 
Education in Weld County, Colorado
Greeley, Colorado
Public universities and colleges in Colorado
Schools in Weld County, Colorado
Educational institutions established in 1889
1889 establishments in Colorado
Tourist attractions in Weld County, Colorado
Education in Aurora, Colorado